Punyamurthula Appalaraju (20 October 1937 – 14 February 1983), better known by his stage name Raja Babu, was an Indian actor and comedian known for his works predominantly in Telugu cinema. He is noted as one of the finest Telugu comedians. A 9 ft bronze statue of Rajababu was unveiled in his birthplace of Rajahmundry, Andhra Pradesh in 2012.

Early life
Raja Babu was born in Rajamundry, East Godavari District, Andhra Pradesh to Punyamurthula Umamaheswara Rao and Ramanamma as Appala Raju. His brothers are also noted comedians, Chitti Babu and Ananth Babu. He completed his Intermediate (10+2) education and successfully completed Teacher Training Course. He worked for sometime as a Telugu teacher after that. During that period, he used to act in dramas  like Kukka Pilla Dorikindi, Naalugilla Chaavadi and Alluri Sitarama Raju.

Life style
Garikapati Raja Rao invited Babu after seeing his acting skills in dramas who worked for Mr. Gayudu. Babu reached Madras in 1960 and initially lived on tuitions. Film Director Addala Narayana Rao gave him a chance to act in his film Samajam in 1960. Babu was known for his slapstick comedy roles. He acted in record 589 movies in less than 20 years.

He has acted as the hero in Tata Manavadu, Pichodi Pelli, Thirupathi, Evariki Vare Yamuna Teere, Manishi Rodduna Paddadu. Leela Rani, Prasanna Rani, Gitanjali and Rama Prabha played with him as his female counterparts. But it was Ramaprabha who had a major share in his career playing opposite him and they were considered as the best comedy duo.

The comedy song Vinara Suramma Kooturu Moguda Vishayam Chebutanu featured by the duo in the film Illu Illalu went on to become the highlight of the entire film and was heard everywhere.

He portrayed the lead role of Giri, grandson (Manavadu) in the film Tata Manavadu directed by Dasari Narayana Rao and teaches a lesson to his father. The cast included S. V. Ranga Rao and Anjali Devi. He produced a few films under Bob and Bob Productions, including Evariki Vaare Yamuna Teeru and Manishi Rodduna Paddadu.

Personal life
Raja Babu married Lakshmi Ammalu (sister-in-law of writer Sri Sri) in 1965 and they have two children: Nagendra Babu and Mahesh Babu. He has four brothers, among them Chitti Babu and Ananth Babu, who are actors and television artists. He has five sisters.

Filmography

Awards

Nandi Award
Filmfare Award South

References

Telugu comedians
Male actors from Andhra Pradesh
Telugu male actors
Indian male comedians
Filmfare Awards South winners
Male actors from Rajahmundry
Male actors in Telugu cinema
Male actors in Tamil cinema
Nandi Award winners
1937 births
1983 deaths
Indian male film actors
20th-century Indian male actors
20th-century comedians
Deaths from cancer in India